Exeter Valley Parks are six parks around Exeter, England, managed by Devon Wildlife Trust. The management was transferred from Exeter City Council, which owns the parks, in May 2019.

The parks
 Ludwell Valley Park. Size . Access is from Ludwell Lane, Topsham Road, Parkland Drive or Pynes Hill. There are several circular walks. There are fields and wooded lanes; the area is a habitat for much wildlife.

 Riverside Valley Park. Between the River Exe and Exeter Ship Canal, one mile downriver from Exeter Quay, lying between Clapperbrook Lane in the north-west and Bridge Road in the south-east.. Size . There is a path alongside the River Exe and flood plain meadows.

 Mincinglake Valley Park. Size . There are paths through woodland and along streams; on Stoke Hill there are wildflower meadows, and views across the city towards the Exe estuary.

 Barley Valley Park. Size . Access is from Higher Barley Mount or from the end of Antonine Crescent. There are paths and bridleways through woods and meadows, on the western ridge line of the city.

 Duryard and Belvidere Valley Park. Total size .

 Whitycombe Valley Park. Size . A meadow accessed from Whitycombe Way, with views across the city.

References

External links
 Mincinglake Valley Park Little Devon

Exeter
Nature reserves in Devon
Parks and open spaces in Devon